The Orinoco Delta is a vast river delta of the Orinoco River, located in eastern Venezuela.

Location

The Orinoco Delta is one of the eight natural regions of Venezuela. 
It covers the whole of Delta Amacuro State and a few square kilometers of Monagas State and Sucre State, comprising all the mouths of the Orinoco.
It is divided into two sections: the principal, at the northernmost part of the system, located between Caño Manamo and the left shore of Caño Araguao, where the majority of villages are established, including the state capital Tucupita; and the secondary, between the right shore of Caño Araguao and Río Grande.

The Warao people live in the region.

Hydrology

The delta is fan-shaped, formed by the Orinoco River as it splits into numerous distributaries, called caños, which meander through the delta on their way to the sea. The main distributary is called the Rio Grande, which empties south-southeast through the southern portion of the delta, and the second major distributary is Caño Manamo, which runs northward along the western edge of the delta. The Orinoco Delta is characterized by being non-centric, lagoon lacking, and oceanic, somewhat similar to the delta of the Niger River.
Daily tides bring sea water up the "caños", causing the "macareo" or pororoca and reversing the flow direction of water, at least on surface.

Environment

The predominant vegetation is in the Orinoco Delta swamp forests ecoregion.
Along the coast and the river margins there are stretches of Amazon-Orinoco-Southern Caribbean mangroves, specifically the Guianan mangroves ecoregion.
To the west, and closer to the coast, there are patches of the Orinoco wetlands ecoregion.

The delta includes large areas of permanent wetlands as well as seasonally-flooded freshwater swamp forests. The river margins of the delta are fringed with mangroves.

References

Sources

External links
 Venezuela Tourism Directory
 Geo-Environmental Characterization of the Delta del Orinoco (University of Texas)
 
 
 

River deltas
Delta
Delta
Biosphere reserves of Venezuela
Orinoco basin
Wetlands of Venezuela
Geography of Delta Amacuro
Geography of Monagas
Geography of Sucre (state)
Landforms of South America